Baš ti ljepo stoje Suze is the name of the tenth album by Hari Mata Hari. It was recorded throughout 2001 and released in July same year.

Track listing

 "Kao Domine"
 "Zjenico oka moga"
 "Baš ti ljepo stoje suze"
 "Sad znam fol"
 "Kada izgorim"
 "Ja imam te a k'o da nemam te'"
 "Zavedi me"
 "Proklet sam što sve ti opraštam"
 "Ja odavno nemam razloga za smjeh"
 "Naći ću sebi nekog na ovom globusu"

Personnel
Hajrudin Varešanović – vocals
Karlo Martinović – guitar
Miki Bodlović – bass, backup vocals
Izo Kolećić – percussion, and drums
Emir Mehić – keyboardS
Dragana Mirković – vocals on 6
Suljeman Ramadovski – vocals on 4
Šestan "Droga" Samir – keyboards, synthesizers, programming, harmonica, percussion, backup vocals

References

Hari Mata Hari albums
2001 albums